Ancistrophora may refer to:
Ancistrophora (fly), a genus of flies in the family Tachinidae
Ancistrophora (plant), a genus of plants in the family Asteraceae, currently considered a synonym of Verbesina